The 1981 Buffalo Bills season was the franchise's 12th season in the National Football League, and the 22nd overall.

The season's most memorable moment was probably a Hail Mary catch against the New England Patriots in Week Twelve. The 36-yard touchdown pass from Bills quarterback Joe Ferguson to running back Roland Hooks as time expired won the game for Buffalo, 20–17. The win proved to be crucial in giving Buffalo the final playoff spot in the AFC in 1981. The Bills qualified for the playoffs, but lost, 28-21, to the Cincinnati Bengals.

Offseason 
The Bills were coming off of their first division title since 1966, and their first since the merger. Coach Chuck Knox's Bills, in his fourth season with the team, were considered a contender in the AFC.

In their 1981 NFL preview, Sports Illustrated's Paul Zimmerman wrote, "A word of advice: Go to Vegas and take the price on Buffalo to go all the way. The odds are right. Just look at how close the Bills came last year. ... The Bills are a hungry team, on the rise. They'll have to stay almost injury-free, though, because they're in big trouble if one of the big boys goes down, i.e., [Joe] Ferguson, Nose Guard Freddy Smerlas, Wide Receiver Jerry Butler or Halfback Joe Cribbs, who handled the ball more times (389) than any back in the NFL, counting passes caught and punt and kick returns as well as his rushes."

NFL draft 

Running back Robb Riddick played eight seasons for the Bills; he started eight games and ran for 632 total yards in 1986, and he became a short-yardage specialist in 1988

Said Zimmerman about the team's first pick, "(Coach Chuck) Knox is a ball control coach, and he's been desperately trying to juice up the fullback position, to take some heat off the 190-pound Cribbs. But No. 1 draft choice Booker Moore from Penn State came down with a nerve disorder called Guillain–Barré syndrome."

Personnel

Staff/coaches

Roster

Regular season

Schedule

Standings

Game Summaries

Week 3

Week 9

Week 10

Week 14

 Source: 
    
    
    
    
    
    
    
    
    

Coming off their win at home against the Washington Redskins, the Buffalo Bills traveled to San Diego to face the Chargers and their potent offense. Buffalo's defense would face a tall task in slowing the Chargers who, in their previous two games, outscored their opponents 89–38. This game was a clash of style that pitted the Chargers and their pass-oriented Air Coryell offense versus Chuck Knox and his run-heavy, ball control offense. Defensively the teams also contrasted starkly with the Chargers ranking near the bottom of the NFL (26th overall), and the Bills ranking among the top defenses (6th overall). In the 1st quarter both teams traded rushing touchdowns as Chuck Muncie scored on a 9-yard run to give the home a lead, and Bills' quarterback Joe Ferguson scored on a 3-yard run to tie the game. The 2nd quarter produced a 21-point flurry that began when Dan Fouts threw a touchdown pass of 17 yards to Wes Chandler. The Bills answered when Roosevelt Leaks scored on a 9-yard run to tie the game briefly at 14–14. Dan Fouts put the Chargers ahead before the half when he connected with Kellen Winslow on a 67-yard touchdown pass. In the 3rd quarter the Bills tied the game when Roosevelt Leaks scored his second touchdown of the game on a 1-yard run. The Chargers took back the lead with Rolf Benirschke kicking a 29-yard field goal to give the Chargers a 24–21 lead. The Bills answered with a fourth rushing touchdown when Joe Cribbs scored on a 1-yard run. The Chargers cut the Bills' lead to 28–27 in fourth quarter when Rolf Benirschke kicked a 27-yard field. The Bills hung on to win the game and upset the heavily favored Chargers. Despite the Chargers outgaining the Bills 482 to 318 in total yards, the Bills forced three Chargers turnovers (1 fumble, 2 INTs) that allowed the Bills to keep the Chargers' potent offense on the sideline. With the win the Bills improved to 9–5.

Stats
 Dan Fouts 28/42, 343 Yds, 2 TD, INT
 Chuck Muncie 22 Rush, 113 Rush Yds, 1 Rush TD
 Kellen Winslow 6 Rec, 126 Yds, 1 TD
 Joe Ferguson 13/29, 248 Yds, 4 Rush Yds, 1 Rush TD
 Roosevelt Leaks 8 Rush, 28 Rush Yds, 2 Rush TDs
 Frank Lewis 5 Rec, 113 Yds

Playoffs

Wild Card 

    
    
    
    
    
    
    
    
    
    

The Bills traveled to Shea Stadium, where the Jets were playing in their first playoff game since the 1970 merger. In a cold rain the Jets got off to a poor start as Bruce Harper fumbled the opening kickoff at his 25 and Charles Romes ran back the fumble for a touchdown only sixteen seconds into the matchup. The Bills raced to a 24–0 lead in the second quarter as Frank Lewis caught two Joe Ferguson passes for touchdowns; the first was a pass from the Bills 40 yard line caught by Lewis at the Jets 32 and run in, then Joe Cribbs caught a 50-yarder, setting up Lewis' second catch; later Rufus Bess picked off Richard Todd and ran back 49 yards, setting up a field goal. But in the second the Jets began clawing back as Mickey Shuler caught a 30-yard touchdown in traffic (it was Shuler's first catch of the entire 1981 season) from Todd and following a Greg Buttle interception of Ferguson Pat Leahy booted a 26-yard field goal. A 19-yarder from Leahy was the only score in the third, then early in the fourth Ferguson was picked off by Donald Dykes, but Todd was intercepted by Bill Simpson. Following the Simpson pick Ferguson was intercepted again, by Jerry Holmes, but the Bills defense forced a mediocre punt by Chuck Ramsey caught at the 50. Three plays later Joe Cribbs caught a toss-sweep and ran in a 45-yard touchdown for Buffalo. But the Jets refused to give in; Todd tossed a 30-yard score to Bobby Jones and later Kevin Long ran in a 1-yard score. The Jets got the ball back in the final minutes, but a sack by Fred Smerlas led to a last-ditch Todd drive to the endzone; after completions to Gaffney and Scott Dierking Todd fired from the Bills 11 for the endzone but was picked off by Bill Simpson, ending a 31–27 Bills playoff win, only the third in the team's history and first since winning back-to-back AFL titles in the 1964 and '65 seasons.

Divisional 

    
    
    
    
    
    
    

After their thrilling Wild Card win in Shea Stadium, the Buffalo Bills traveled to Riverfront Stadium to play the #1 seeded Cincinnati Bengals. The Bills fell behind early when Cincinnati scored two rushing touchdowns in the 1st quarter to take a 14-0 lead. The Bills began chipping away at the deficit in the 2nd quarter when Joe Cribbs scored from 1 yard out and cut Cincinnati's lead to 14-7 at the half. In the 3rd quarter the Bills tied the game when Joe Cribbs scored on a 44-yard touchdown run. The Bengals promptly retook the lead with a 20-yard touchdown run from Charles Alexander. The Bills fought back and tied the game again in the 4th quarter when Jerry Butler caught a 21-yard touchdown pass from Joe Ferguson. The Bengals broke the deadlock and took a 28-21 lead when Cris Collinsworth scored on a 16-yard touchdown pass from Ken Anderson. The Bills attempted to tie the game at the end of regulation, but Joe Ferguson's fourth down pass fell incomplete and Cincinnati held on for the win.

Awards and honors

All-Pros 
First Team
 Fred Smerlas, Nose tackle

Second Team
 Joe Cribbs, Running back
 Frank Lewis, Wide receiver

References 

 Bills on Pro Football Reference
 Bills on jt-sw.com
 Bills Stats on jt-sw.com

Buffalo Bills seasons
Buffalo Bills
Buffalo